The Book and the Sword is a 1960 Hong Kong film based on Louis Cha's novel The Book and the Sword. Directed and written by Lee Sun-fung, the film was divided into two parts, respectively released on 4 May and 9 June 1960 in Hong Kong.

Cast
 Note: Some of the characters' names are in Cantonese romanisation.

 Cheung Ying as Chan Ka-lok / Kin-lung Emperor
 Yung Siu-yi as Princess Fragrance
 Tsi Law-lin as Fok-ching-tung
 Chan Kam-tong as Man Tai-loi
 Leung So-kam as Lok Bing
 Shek Yin-tsi as Yu Yu-tung
 Ma Kam-ling as Lei Yuen-chi
 Lam Kau as Tsui Tin-wang
 Sheung-koon Kwan-wai as Chow Yee
 Shih Kien as Cheung Chiu-chung
 Yeung Yip-wang as Luk Fei-ching
 Ho Siu-hung as Muk-cheuk-lun
 Wong Chor-san as Chow Chung-ying
 Yuet-ching Lee as Mrs Chow
 Chan Tsui-ping as Yuk Yu-yee
 Siu Hon-sang as Pak Chun
 Cheung Sing-fai
 Liu Jialiang
 Yuen Siu-tien
 Chow Chung
 Wah Wan-fung

External links

The Book and the Sword Part 1 at the Hong Kong Movie Database
The Book and the Sword Part 2 at the Hong Kong Movie Database

1960 films
Wuxia films
Films based on The Book and the Sword
Films about rebels
Hong Kong martial arts films
Qianlong Emperor
1960s Cantonese-language films